is a Japanese animation director.

Anime involved in
Bubblegum Crisis: Director (episodes 1–2), Technical Director (episodes 1–2)
Cardcaptor Sakura: Episode Director (ep 66)
Dōjin Work: Director, Storyboard (episodes 1, 3, 12)
El Hazard: The Wanderers: Storyboard (Ep 24)
Leviathan The Last Defense: Director, Storyboard (Opening; Ending; episode 1), Unit Director (Opening; Ending)
Megazone 23 Part III: Director (episode 1)
Renkin 3-kyuu Magical? Pokahn: Director, Storyboard (episodes 1–2, 6a, 7, 12a), Unit Director (episode 12a)
Strike Witches: Assistant Director
Strike Witches 2: Storyboard (episodes 3, 12), Episode Director (episode 12), Assistant Director
Strike Witches: Operation Victory Arrow: Episode Director (episode 1)
Super Dimensional Fortress Macross II: Lovers Again: Director, Storyboard (episode 1), Episode Director (episode 6)
Tenchi Muyo! Ryo-Ohki OAV 2: Director, Storyboard (episode 13)
Tenchi Muyo! Ryo-Ohki OAV 3: Director, Storyboard (episodes 1, 5), Episode Director (episode 3)
Tenchi Muyo! The Night Before The Carnival: Director, Storyboard
The Super Dimension Fortress Macross: In-Between Animation (ep 21)

References

Anime directors
Living people
Year of birth missing (living people)